The thirteenth season of CSI: Crime Scene Investigation premiered on September 26, 2012, on CBS, and ended on May 15, 2013. It stars Ted Danson and Elisabeth Shue.

Plot 
D.B. and Finn hunt for missing Kaitlyn, while Sara convinces Nick to return to the Las Vegas Crime Lab ("Karma to Burn"), in the thirteenth season of CSI. Russell, Finlay and their team are met with the gruesome, the brutal, and the unusual, including a shootout at the CSI's favorite diner ("Code Blue Plate Special"), the murder of a runaway sex slave ("Wild Flowers"), a body in a piano ("It Was a Very Good Year"), the death of a police dog handler ("Play Dead"), the discovery of a mass grave ("CSI on Fire"), a plane crash ("Risky Business Class"), a news anchor killed on live TV ("Dead Air"), the murder of a tennis star ("Double Fault"), the murder of a Cuban singing sensation ("Exile"), a cheating scandal at a poker tournament ("Last Woman Standing"), a body near 
a forest reserve ("Sheltered"), a ghost hunter's murder (Ghosts of the Past) a sole witness in the form of a 6-year-old girl ("Backfire") and a body in a mud-bath ("Fearless"). Meanwhile, things get personal, as Russell's sons coach is murdered ("Pick and Roll"), a body is found on Warrick's grave ("Fallen Angels"), Brass learns more about Ellie ("Strip Maul"), NYPD Lab Director Mac Taylor heads to Las Vegas ("In Vino Veritas"), Sara became a suspect in a homicide ("Forget Me Not"). Phillips heads to a high school reunion ("Dead of the Class"), and an investigation into a series of Dante's Inferno killings bring the CSIs face-to-face with Black Sabbath ("Skin in the Game"), before jeopardizing the life of one investigator.

Cast

Main

Recurring 
 Marc Vann as Conrad Ecklie (episodes 1, 2, 14, 16, 22)
 Alex Carter as Lou Vartann (episodes 11)
 Larry M. Mitchell as Officer Mitchell (episodes 1, 2, 5, 7, 8, 12, 14, 16, 17, 19–21)

Guest stars 
 William Petersen as Gil Grissom (voice only in episodes 3 & 11)
 Gary Sinise as Mac Taylor (episode 13)
Catrinel Marlon as Elisabetta, Hodges Fiance ( Episodes 13 and 20)

Production 
In episode thirteen of the season, CSI staged a two-part crossover with its spin-off show CSI: NY in which Gary Sinise marked his first appearance in CSI and as his CSI: NY character Mac Taylor; cast member Ted Danson subsequently appeared in the CSI: NY portion of the story. Former cast member William Petersen also returned as Gil Grissom for a voice over in the episode "Dead Air", on the phone with Sara. This appearance was uncredited.  On March 20, 2013, CBS renewed CSI for a fourteenth season, which aired in September 2013.

Episodes

U.S. Nielsen ratings

References 

General references

External links 
 
 CSI: Crime Scene Investigation (season 13) at IMDb

13
2012 American television seasons
2013 American television seasons